Dead Until Dark, published in 2001, is the first novel in Charlaine Harris' series The Southern Vampire Mysteries. It was adapted into True Blood first season.

Dead Until Dark, like the rest of the series, is narrated by Sookie Stackhouse, a telepathic waitress from the small fictional Louisiana town of Bon Temps, not far from the non-fictional town of Shreveport. It is set during the early 2000s, approximately the same time as the book's publication. In the world of the novel, vampires (and other supernatural creatures) are a reality. Sookie Stackhouse falls in love with the vampire, Bill Compton, whom she met at the diner she works at, Merlotte's, owned by Sam Merlotte. At some point in the recent past, Sookie tells us, the invention of synthetic blood, called Tru Blood, has made it unnecessary for vampires to feed on humans for sustenance, thus allowing the world's previously underground vampire community to reveal its existence to humans. Also relevant to plot development is the fact that vampire blood accelerates healing, increases strength, improves the libido, and make the person who drinks it better-looking.

Characters

See also

Characters of The Southern Vampire Mysteries
Characters of True Blood
True Blood

References

2001 American novels
2001 fantasy novels
American vampire novels
The Southern Vampire Mysteries
Novels set in Louisiana
Anthony Award-winning works
American novels adapted into television shows
Ace Books books